Mitsunobu (written: 光信 or 光誠) is a masculine Japanese given name. Notable people with the name include:

, Japanese samurai
 (died 1608), Japanese painter
 (born 1977), Japanese professional wrestler
 (1434–1525), Japanese painter

See also
Mitsunobu reaction, organic reaction

Japanese masculine given names